The Gota is a left tributary of the river Dârjov in Romania. It flows into the Dârjov in Buicești.

References

Rivers of Romania
Rivers of Olt County